Demini River is a river in the Amazon rainforest of the state of Amazonas, Brazil.  It is a tributary of the Rio Negro.

Course

The Demini River rises in the Serra do Aracá State Park, a  conservation unit created in 1990.
It flows southwest through the park, then flows south to join the Rio Negro.
The Toototobi River is a tributary of the upper part of the Demini near the headwaters of the Orinoco near the border of Venezuela.  The Yanomami índios are native to this area.

References

Sources

Further reading

 "Engagement of anthropologists in public dialogue with members of study communities", University of Arizona
 Report of the Medical Team of the Federal University of Rio de Janeiro on Accusations Contained in Patrick Tierney's Darkness in El Dorado
 When Did the Measles Epidemic Begin among the Yanomami?

Tributaries of the Rio Negro (Amazon)
Rivers of Amazonas (Brazilian state)